is a football stadium based in Iwaki, Fukushima Prefecture, Japan. Currently home of J. League club, Iwaki FC following their move from the J-Village Stadium for 2022 season in J3.

Tenants 
It was used of J3 League between Fukushima United FC and Grulla Morioka on 21 September 2014.

Iwaki Green Field renovated field, seat for J2 from 2023 season.

Iwaki FC has been confirmed that stadium uses for J2 League in 2023 after playing at J-Village Stadium previously season in 2022 J3 League.

It was used for J2 League in Matchweek 1 between promoted team J3 Champions, Iwaki FC against runner-up Fujieda MYFC who finished in last year respectively on 18 February 2023.

Renovation
Iwaki FC will enter the J3 League in 2022, but since the spectator seats do not meet the J3 license stadium standards (5000 seats or more) and there are defects in various rooms, at this point the home stadium will be change to J-Village Stadium (Hirono Town) and apply for a license at Iwaki Greenfield, only two games were held as a special match. Also from 2023, the installation standards for lighting equipment will be applied, but J-Village Stadium has not been satisfied with this and urgent action is required. Based on this background, Iwaki city will start considering the renovation of the Iwaki Green Field from FY2021. Renovation policy announced on 27 February 2022. Specifically, we will increase the number of spectator seats to 5,000, install new night lighting equipment and large video equipment, and apply for exceptions such as the doping inspection room and press seats in anticipation of provisional operations toward the acquisition of a J2 license. We are planning to carry out the construction of the rooms necessary for along with this, in anticipation of an increase in the use of the green field by the Iwaki FC, we plan to change the adjacent multi-purpose plaza to artificial turf and install a simple lighting tower.

References

External links
Official site

1995 establishments in Japan
Sports venues completed in 1995
Iwaki, Fukushima
Football venues in Japan
Sports venues in Fukushima Prefecture
Iwaki FC
Fukushima United FC